Vivienne Harris is a camogie player a member of Cork's  All Ireland Camogie Championship winning team in 1995, 1997, 1998, 2002,  and 2005.

National League
She is the only player to have captained three successive winning teams in the National Camogie League 1995, 1996, 1997, 1998, 1999, 2000 and 2001. Striking up a successful partnership with Gemma O'Connor, she dominated midfield during the All Ireland finals of 2004 and 2005. She was a member of St. Finbarrs.

References

External links
 Camogie.ie Official Camogie Association Website
 Wikipedia List of Camogie players

Year of birth missing (living people)
Cork camogie players
Living people